Sobar Upore Tumi is a Bangladeshi Bengali-language film. The film, directed by Bangladeshi filmmaker F I Manik, is a romantic family story. It stars Shakib Khan, Swastika Mukherjee, Victor Banerjee, Uzzal, Suchorita and others. In India this film was released under the title Aamar Bhai Aamar Bon. It is an Indian and Bangladesh joint production. This film also dubbed in Hindi as Hello Zindagi (2017) under the banner of Angel Digital.

Plot
The story is as Mr. Chowdhury (Uzzol) a businessman lived with his wife Mamata (Suchorita) and children Rahul (Shakib Khan) and Ria. An accident totally changed his life. Mamata could not bear the accident and was admitted into a mental asylum. Ruahul and Ria became homeless by the conspiracy of Mr. Chowdhury's sister. Mr. Chowdhury though lost his family. In such a condition, Rahul and Ria started their struggling in life. Rahul and Ria grew up and Rahul took a job as a driver of Biplab babu. Mithila (Swastika Mukherjee) was the only child of Biplab (Victor Banerjee). She initially did not like Rahul for his attitude, but later she fell in love with him. Mithila helped Rahul a lot to establish his own business. Ultimately, Rahul became successful and with the help of his well-wishers, he found his parents. In this way, everything ended on a happy note.

Cast
 Shakib Khan as Rahul
 Swastika Mukherjee as Mithila
 Victor Banerjee as Mithila's father
 Uzzol as Rahul's father
 Suchorita as Rahul's mother
 Aliraj
 Suyab Khan
 Sayontoni Lisa
 Misha Sawdagor
 Ahmed Sarif
 Shiva Shanu
 Kabila
 Nasrin
 Rasheda Chowdhary
 Raju Sarkar

Crew
 Producer: Kishore Shah
 Story: Chatku Ahmed
 Screenplay: Chatku Ahmed
 Director: F I Manik
 Script: Mohammad Rafiquzzaman
 Dialogue: Chatku Ahmed
 Cinematography: Mostafa Kamal
 Editing: Touhid Hossain Chowdhury
 Music: Devendranath and Alauddin Ali
 Distributor: Kishan Chalochitra Ltd.

Music

Sobar Upore Tumi'''s music was directed by Devendranath (India) and Alluddion Ali (Bangladesh). Munshi Wadud wrote the lyrics.

Soundtrack

Home mediaSobar Upore Tumi'''s copyrights take G-Series and made as VCD, DVD and cassette marketed/distributed in Bangladesh. For India the films copyrights take Angel and made as VCD, DVD and cassette.

References

External links 

2009 films
2009 romance films
Bengali-language Bangladeshi films
Bengali-language Indian films
Films scored by Alauddin Ali
2000s Bengali-language films